Teen Mom: Young and Pregnant, (stylised as Teen Mom: Young + Pregnant) is an American reality television series that premiered on March 12, 2018 on MTV. It is a spinoff of the Teen Mom franchise, which itself is a spinoff of MTV's 16 and Pregnant series. Teen Mom: Young + Pregnant is a docuseries similar to the original 16 and Pregnant format. It follows the lives of different teenage moms: Brianna Jaramillo, Kayla Sessler, Rachel Beaver, Kiaya Elliott, Madisen Beith and formerly Lexi Tatman, Jade Cline, Ashley Jones and Kayla Jones as they go through pregnancy and become young mothers.

Production
On June 27, 2018, the show's first season was extended to include a B season, that began airing on October 15 and concluded on December 17, 2018. On January 10, 2019, the series was renewed for a second season that would feature two new moms. On January 25, 2019, it was announced that Lexi was cut from the second season and is being replaced by a new girl, Kiaya from Virginia. On May 7, 2019, it was announced that Jade Cline was moving to Teen Mom 2, replacing Jenelle Evans.

On September 24, 2019, it was announced that the second season would premiere on October 22, 2019. It also was confirmed that two new moms, Rachel Beaver and Kiaya Elliott, would be joining the cast to replace Cline and Tatman.

In December 2020, it was announced that Ashley Jones would be moving to Teen Mom 2 to replace Chelsea Houska. In May 2021, it was announced that 16 and Pregnant star Madisen Beith would replace Ashley Jones in the third season. Another new cast member named Kayla Jones was also announced as a new cast member for the third season, which premiered on September 7, 2021.

On January 31, 2022, it was announced that Kayla Jones was cut from the second half of the third season with Madisen becoming a full time cast member. Also in 2022, Rachel announced she was leaving due to mental health.

Cast

Jade Cline
Jade Cline (from Indianapolis, Indiana) is the mother of Kloie Kenna Austin who was born on September 18, 2017. The father is her then-boyfriend Sean Austin. The couple split in February 2019. They have since reconciled and became engaged in Summer 2022.

Brianna Jaramillo
Brianna Jaramillo (from Portland, Oregon) is the mother of Braeson Messiah Jaramillo who was born on August 26, 2017. In season 1b, Brianna moved from Milwaukee, Wisconsin to Portland, Oregon. Brianna began a relationship with Robert Reams in early 2018 but ended the relationship in October 2018.

Kayla Sessler
Kayla Sessler (from DeKalb, Illinois) is the mother of Izaiah Cole Sessler (né Alexander) who was born on September 30, 2017. The father is her ex-boyfriend Stephen Alexander. In February 2019, Kayla announced she was pregnant with her second child, a girl, due in August 2019. The father of her second child is her boyfriend Luke Davis. On August 16, 2019, Kayla gave birth to daughter Ariah Jordynn Davis.

Ashley Jones
Ashley Jones (from Vallejo, California) is the mother of Holly Isabella Lockett who was born on September 15, 2017. The father is her husband, Bariki "Bar" Smith.

Lexi Tatman
Alexis "Lexi" Tatman (from Montrose, Colorado) is the mother of Tobias Ryker Lopez-DeLuna who was born on October 29, 2017. On August 26, 2019, Lexi announced via Instagram that she had given birth to another baby boy, Jay Wolfe. The father is her now husband Kyler Lopez.

Rachel Beaver
Rachel Beaver (from Madisonville, Tennessee) got pregnant while seeing both her on-and-off boyfriend Drew and his best friend Jacob.

Kiaya Elliott
Kiaya Elliott (from Norfolk, Virginia) got pregnant after her girlfriend, Teazha cheated on her. X'Zayveon is the father of her child. Teazha moved in and offered her help in raising her child Amour Elliot.

Madisen Beith
Madisen Beith (from Heber Springs, Arkansas) was 17 years old when she gave birth to her and Christien's daughter Camille Victoria.

Kayla Jones
Kayla Jones (from Laurel, Maryland) welcomed daughter Mecca with her best friend Makel. Kayla is upset because, since their relationship ended, Makel keeps bringing new girlfriends around their daughter.

Timeline of cast members

Episodes

Series overview

Season 1 (2018)

Season 2 (2019–20)

Season 3 (2021–22)

Specials

References

External links
Official Show Website

2018 American television series debuts
2010s American reality television series
2020s American reality television series
American television spin-offs
Reality television spin-offs
Teenage pregnancy in television
MTV reality television series
Television series about teenagers